Stanford-le-Hope is a town, former civil parish and Church of England parish situated in the county of Essex, England. Often known locally simply as Stanford,  the town is within the unitary authority of Thurrock and located 23.8 miles (38.4 km) east of Charing Cross in London. In 1931 the parish had a population of 4311.

Early modernist author Joseph Conrad lived in Stanford-le-Hope from 1896 to 1898. More recent notable figures would include author Emma Robinson and comedian Phill Jupitus.

Geography
Stanford-le-Hope is bordered to the north by the A13 road and to the south by the Thames Estuary. It is located 12.7 miles (20.5 km) west of Southend-on-Sea. The town centre has a village feel with its 800-year-old church, St Margarets making a prominent and attractive landmark around which shops, pubs and restaurants have grown to create a lively core to the town.

As Stanford-le-Hope grows in size, it has started to incorporate neighbouring settlements such as Corringham, Mucking and Fobbing, the latter of which was the scene of one of the uprisings which led to the Peasants' Revolt.

The River Hope, a tributary of the Thames, runs through the town.

Locally there are a number of parks and nature reserves, notably Thurrock Thameside Nature Reserve, with a visitor centre providing views up and down the Thames across both industrial and natural landscapes including the Mucking Flats and Marshes SSSI.

In 2014, a group of residents led a restoration project which raised funds to finance a restoration of the war memorial, as part of the commemoration of the 1914-1919 conflict in Europe.

Transport and industry
The town is served by Stanford-le-Hope railway station. The town is home to many commuters working in London, thanks to its proximity to the capital and its c2c-operated London, Tilbury and Southend line rail connections.

Many residents also travel along the nearby A13 to work in the Lakeside Shopping Centre, as well as the industrial and commercial businesses along the north bank of the Thames running west towards the Port of London.

Until 1999 the town was home to two refineries located on the nearby Thames, Shell Haven and Coryton. The Shell site ceased operating in 1999 and has since been redeveloped as the London Gateway deepwater container port, with attendant logistics and commercial development.

Politics
, Stanford-le-Hope is represented on Thurrock Council by seven councillors from the Conservative Party - Shane Hebb, Terry Piccolo, James Halden, Gary Collins, Jack Duffin, Shane Ralph and Alex Anderson, and one Thurrock Independent councillor, Gary Byrne.

The 2021 Thurrock Council local election saw the Conservatives win every contested seat in East Thurrock, including - for the first time ever -  neighbouring ward East Tilbury which saw the reelection of Cllr Sue Sammons who stood for the Conservative Party.

The serving Member of Parliament is Stephen Metcalfe from the Conservative Party, who was re-elected for the fourth time at the 2019 UK general election.

On 1 April 1936 the parish was abolished to form Thurrock.

References

External links

Towns in Essex
Populated places on the River Thames
Former civil parishes in Essex
Thurrock